New Malden railway station is in the Royal Borough of Kingston upon Thames in south London.

The station is served by South Western Railway, and is in Travelcard Zone 4.

History

The station was opened by the London and South Western Railway on 1 December 1846, originally being named Malden. It has been renamed several times: in May 1859 it became New Malden and Coombe; on 1 March 1862 Coombe and Malden; in November 1912 Malden for Coombe; in 1955 Malden; and finally, on 16 September 1957, it took the present name of New Malden.

The deaths of members of station staff in an air raid during WWII is commemorated on a plaque on a wall in the ticket office and another is located on the high street opposite Waitrose.

Although still theoretically in use, Platforms 2 and 3 on the "fast" lines have been mothballed, and their gravelly surface, weeds and protruding cable ducting poses a trip hazard and makes them unlikely to be used even if a disruption prevents use of the "slow" lines on Platforms 1 and 4.

There are still platform boards at platforms 2 and 3 on the “fast” lines. One of the platform boards still work to this day. But there’s no announcement playing for fast trains. 

New platform signage was installed in 2009, adhering to the new national standard using 'Brunel' typeface in white on a navy background.

South West Trains installed automatic ticket gates in the main ticket hall in September 2009, including Oyster card readers allowing use of the Oyster "pay as you go" system.

After local opposition a proposed permanent closure of the southern entrance from Dukes Avenue and Station Avenue, which would have left only the Coombe Road entrance, was amended to opening it only for morning and evening weekday peak hours with ticket inspectors. In practice the ticket barriers are very often left open and unstaffed, and the southern entrance is generally left open and unstaffed.

Services 

South Western Railway operate northbound services to London Waterloo and southbound services to Richmond, Hampton Court and Shepperton.

Connections
London Buses routes 213 and K1 serve the station.

References

External links 

Railway stations in the Royal Borough of Kingston upon Thames
Railway stations in Great Britain opened in 1846
Former London and South Western Railway stations
Railway stations served by South Western Railway
Railway station
1846 establishments in England